Minsk-Pasažyrski is the main passenger railway station in Minsk, Belarus. It is located in the centre of Minsk. It is sometimes called Minsk Ploshchad Lenina due to the metro station serving the terminal, or simply Minsk.

History
The station was built in 1873 as Vilenski vakzal, Vilnius station. The initial wooden building was demolished in 1890 and rebuilt in stone. During World War II, Minsk railway station was completely destroyed. It was rebuilt in 1945–1946 and served until 1991. The new building of Minsk-Passazhyrski railway station was built in 1991–2002. Its construction was delayed for financial difficulties. However, now Minsk has one of the most modern and up-to-date railway stations in the CIS. There are plans to move all suburban rail traffic from Minsk-Passazhyrski to smaller stations Minsk-Uskhodni (East), Minsk-Paudnyovy (South) and Minsk-Paunochny (North) by 2020.

Traffic

National rail
Minsk Passazhirsky is the hub of national passenger transport. It is also served by several international trains to various countries of Europe, mainly to Russian and Ukrainian destinations. Some of the international routes are the Paris-Moscow express, the Berlin-Moscow Strizh, the Minsk-Novosibirsk express, and the Polonez Warsaw-Moscow.

It is the center, with the neighbour Minsk Institut Kultury station, of a suburban rail linking the capital to several cities and town of its suburb in the district and through the region.

Urban transport
The station is served by Minsk Metro at Ploshchad Lenina station (Lenin Square), part of the Maskoŭskaja line. The station is also served by the tramway and by trolleybus.

Trains and destinations

International

Gallery

See also
Rail transport in Belarus
Belorusskaja Železnaja Doroga
Fanipol railway station, part of the suburban network

Notes and references

External links

 Minsk railroad terminal – Pictures
 Pictures of a building from within
 Fototour: Minsk Railway station at night

Railway stations in Belarus
Transport in Minsk
Passazhirsky station
Railway stations opened in 1873